Marcus Deshawn Allen (born August 7, 1996) is an American football inside linebacker for the Pittsburgh Steelers of the National Football League (NFL). He played college football at Penn State.

Early life
Allen attended Dr. Henry A. Wise Jr. High School in Upper Marlboro, Maryland, where he was a three year letterman. He recorded just over 150 tackles and four interceptions over his four years in high school. He was rated a four-star recruit by Scout and 247Sports and a three-star prospect by ESPN and Rivals. He was ranked as a Top 30 prospect at safety nationally by Scout and 247Sports, and rated the No. 6 prep player in Maryland by 247Sports. He was named after All Pro and Superbowl Champion running back Marcus Allen.

Recruiting

College career
Playing all 13 games, starting 7, Allen recorded a total of 58 tackles with one sack and two tackle for loss. During his sophomore season he ranked second on the team in tackles with 81 only behind Brandon Bell. Had six tackles and one forced fumble vs Georgia in the 2016 TaxSlayer Bowl. In his junior season he ranked No. 16 in the Big Ten with 7.9 tackles per game. No. 3 in the Big Ten and tied for No. 30 in the FBS with two fumble recoveries. The 22-tackle effort vs. Minnesota ranked No. 3 on the FBS single-game list in 2016 (24 - Obi Melifonwu, UConn & Rodney Butler, NMSU). In 2016, Allen also blocked the field goal that Grant Haley would return for a touchdown to upset No. 2 Ohio State, which became known as the Block Six.

College statistics

Professional career
On November 10, 2017, it was announced that Allen had accepted his invitation to play in the 2018 Senior Bowl. On January 17, 2018, Allen played in the 2018 Reese's Senior Bowl as part of Denver Broncos' head coach Vance Joseph's North team that lost 45–16 to the South. Allen attended the NFL Scouting Combine in Indianapolis, Indiana, but opted to only perform the vertical jump, broad jump, bench press, and short shuttle. On March 20, 2018, he attended Penn State's pro day and completed the 40-yard dash, 20-yard dash, 10-yard dash, and three-cone drill. At the conclusion of the pre-draft process, Allen was projected to be a third or fourth round pick by the majority of NFL draft experts and scouts. He was ranked the fourth best strong safety prospect in the draft by DraftScout.com.

The Pittsburgh Steelers selected Allen in the fifth round (148th overall) of the 2018 NFL Draft. Allen was the 15th safety drafted in 2018.

On May 10, 2018, the Steelers signed Allen to a four-year, $2.75 million contract that includes a signing bonus of $292,637.

On August 31, 2019, Allen was waived by the Steelers and was signed to the practice squad the next day. On December 20, he was promoted to the active roster.

Allen was moved to linebacker for the 2020 season, and signed a one-year contract extension with the team on March 9, 2021.

On March 15, 2022, the Steelers placed an original-round restricted free agent tender on Allen.

References

External links
 Penn State bio

1996 births
Living people
American football safeties
American football linebackers
Penn State Nittany Lions football players
People from Upper Marlboro, Maryland
Pittsburgh Steelers players
Players of American football from Maryland
Sportspeople from the Washington metropolitan area